Žatika Sport Centre is a multi-purpose indoor arena in Poreč, Croatia. It was built for the needs of the 2009 World Men's Handball Championship, and formally opened on 21 November 2008. Total area of the hall is about 14,000 square metres, and it has a total seating capacity of around 3,700. The hall will host again in 2025 with the country, Denmark and Norway.

Apart from the big hall, a small hall is being planned too. It will have 213.40 square metres. There will be a fitness hall of 86.26 square metres as well, on the same level with the main courts. Along with all following contents, there will be additional room for restaurants and sport clubs' needs, as well as for a number of temporary objects for events and fairs.

The authors of the project are Sonja Jurković, Sanja Gašparović, Nataša Martinčić and Tatjana Peraković.

See also
 List of indoor arenas in Croatia
 List of indoor arenas in Europe

References

External links
Venue information

Sports venues completed in 2008
Indoor arenas in Croatia
Handball venues in Croatia
Buildings and structures in Istria County
2008 establishments in Croatia